This is a list of active rebel groups around the world. A "rebel group" is defined here as a polity that uses armed conflict in opposition to established government (or governments) for reasons such as to seek political change or to establish, maintain, or to gain independence.

Rebel groups by state 
Rebel groups are listed by the states within which they operate.

Groups that control territory 

Groups that "control territory" are defined as any group that hold any populated or inhabited town, city, village, or defined area that is under the direct administration or military control of the group. Such control may be contested and might be temporary or fluctuating, especially under the circumstance of conflict. It does not include the governments of stable breakaway states or other states with limited recognition.

See also 
 List of rebel groups that control territory
 List of guerrilla movements
 List of designated terrorist organizations
 List of ongoing military conflicts
 Lists of active separatist movements
 Violent non-state actor

References 

Rebel groups by country